The Coolgardie woodlands is an ecoregion in southern Western Australia. The predominant vegetation is woodlands and mallee scrub. The ecoregion is a transitional zone between the Mediterranean-climate forests, woodlands, and shrublands of Southwest Australia and the deserts and dry scrublands of the Australian interior.

Location and description
The Coolgardie woodlands is part of the Mediterranean-climate Southwest Australia biogeographic region, whose forests, woodlands, and shrublands are globally noteworthy for their diversity of plant species.

The Coolgardie woodlands ecoregion consists of two IBRA regions – Coolgardie and the smaller Hampton bioregion. Coolgardie bioregion is bounded on the south and west by Mediterranean-climate ecoregions, the coastal Esperance mallee ecoregion to the south, and the Southwest Australia savanna ecoregion to the west. The Coolgardie woodlands' northern boundary is the Mulga-eucalypt line, which marks the boundary between eucalypt-dominated woodlands of Southwest Australia and the drier Mulga (Acacia-dominated) woodlands of Australia's interior. The Western Australian mulga shrublands, Great Victoria Desert, and Nullarbor Plains xeric shrublands ecoregions lie to the north.

The Hampton region is coastal, lying southeast of the Coolgardie region on the shore of the Great Australian Bight. It is bounded on the north and east by the Nullarbor Plains xeric shrublands.

Flora
The ecoregion is home to several plant communities, including eucalyptus woodlands and shrublands of mallee and acacia. 
Woodlands of Salmon gum (Eucalyptus salmonophloia) and gimlet (Eucalyptus salubris) are common in central Coolgardie, generally on rolling plains and river valleys on red loam soils over red clay. Salmon gums reach 15-20 meters in height, and gimlet a height of 8 to 12 meters. The woodlands are open and irregular, and with an understory of low shrubs (including Maireana sedifolia and  Atriplex spp.), herbs, and grasses.

Protected areas
A 2017 assessment found that 16,323 km², or 12%, of the ecoregion is in protected areas – 14,731 km² (11%) of the Coolgardie region and 1,592 km² (15%) of the Hampton region. Protected areas in the Coolgardie region include Karroun Hill Nature Reserve in the northwestern corner, Mount Manning Nature Reserve, Jilbadji Nature Reserve, and Goldfields Woodlands National Park in western Coolgardie, and Dundas Nature Reserve which extends south into the Esperance mallee. Ngadju Indigenous Protected Area was established in 2020, and protects extensive areas of woodland.

The coastal Nuytsland Nature Reserve covers the western portion of the Hampton region, and Nullarbor National Park covers its easternmost portion.

See also
 Great Western Woodlands

External links

References

 
Ecoregions of Western Australia
Mallee Woodlands and Shrublands
Mediterranean forests, woodlands, and scrub in Australia
Southwest Australia